Ron Riley may refer to:

 Ronald Riley (born 1947), field hockey player
 Ron Riley (basketball, born 1950), former National Basketball Association player
 Ron Riley (basketball, born 1973), basketball player selected in the 1996 NBA Draft
 Ron Riley (ice hockey) (born 1948), Canadian ice hockey player who played in the WHA with the Ottawa Nationals